Alessandro Pauli (1582 – 23 July 1645) was a Roman Catholic prelate who served as Bishop of Vico Equense (1643–1645).

Biography
Luigi Riccio was born in Anagni, Italy in 1582. On 23 February 1643, he was appointed during the papacy of Pope Urban VIII as Bishop of Vico Equense. On 22 March 1643, he was consecrated bishop by Bernardino Spada, Cardinal-Priest of San Pietro in Vincoli with Lelio Falconieri, Titular Archbishop of Thebae, and Alfonso Sacrati, Bishop Emeritus of Comacchio, serving as co-consecrators. He served as Bishop of Vico Equense until his death on 23 July 1645.

References

External links and additional sources
 (for Chronology of Bishops) 
 (for Chronology of Bishops)  

17th-century Italian Roman Catholic bishops
Bishops appointed by Pope Urban VIII
1582 births
1645 deaths
People from Anagni